= Soup Creek =

Coordinates: 41°15′24″N 120°18′21″W

Soup Creek is a stream located in Modoc County in the U.S. state of California.
